Dr. Indu Shahani is a leading Indian educationist, who currently serves as the founding Dean of the Indian School of Management & Entrepreneurship (ISME) and a former Sheriff of Mumbai.

She is also the President & Chair - Academics of the Indian School of Design & Innovation (ISDI), ISDI-WPP School of Communication and the Indian School of Management & Entrepreneurship (ISME).

Career

While Dr. Shahani continues to be Chief Mentor of colleges of the HSNC Board, from 1 August 2016, she has also accepted a position as the President & Chair - Academics of the Indian School of Design & Innovation (ISDI), ISDI | WPP School of Communication and the Indian School of Management & Entrepreneurship (ISME); and is the Founding Dean of ISME.

Dr. Shahani served as a principal at the HR College, Churchgate, a premieré educational institute under the umbrella of the University of Mumbai.

Dr. Shahani is the first Indian to be appointed vice-chair on the Board of the Governors of the International Baccalaureate where she served from 2001 - 2010.

Shahani was awarded the Honorary Doctor of Letters degree by the University of Westminster in London on 16 November 2009. As a tribute to Dr. Shahani, the university had instituted the Sheriff of Mumbai's Scholarships for Women from Mumbai to study a Master's programme in the years 2009 and 2010 in London.

Dr Shahani was appointed the Sheriff of Mumbai herself for 2008 and 2009. The Sheriff of Mumbai is an honorary post and is a link between the citizens and the Government. As the Sheriff of Mumbai, she launched the 1298 Women's Helpline against domestic violence and harassment with the help of leading NGO's.

Dr. Shahani is a visiting faculty member at UC Berkeley and NYU Stern in the United States.

Dr. Shahani has received many awards, such as the 'Roll of Honor' award towards her outstanding contributions in leadership and to Education and Partnerships with Deakin University in India; 'Excellence Award for Humanitarian Service' by the Rotary Club of Bombay; 'Women of the Decade Achievers Award' by ASSOCHAM Ladies League Mumbai; 'Citizen of Mumbai Award' by Rotary Club of Bombay; 'Excellence in Education Award' at the FLO Great Women Achiever Awards; and 'Achiever of Excellence - Women Achievers 2012' by Bombay Management Association recognising her contribution to society at large.

Directorships
•	Bajaj Electricals Limited

•	Eureka Forbes Limited

•	Colgate-Palmolive (India) Limited

•	Clariant Chemical (India) Ltd.

•	United Spirits Limited, Diageo

•	Franklin Templeton Investments

•	Indian Oil Corporation (2008-2013)

•	Member, United Way of Mumbai

•	Member, Save the Children

Academic board positions
•	International Baccalaureate Organisation (2001-2010)

•	Westminster Business School, London

•	EDHEC Business School, Paris

•	Member, State Knowledge Advisory Board of Andhra Pradesh

•	Member, Governing Council, MICA

•	Member, Oberoi International School

External links

References

Living people
1954 births
Indian women educational theorists
Sheriffs of Mumbai
Sindhi people
20th-century Indian educational theorists
Educators from Maharashtra
Women educators from Maharashtra
20th-century women educators
20th-century Indian women